Frank Henry Taylor (10 October 1907 – 1 October 2003) was a Conservative Party politician in the United Kingdom who was the Member of Parliament for the Manchester Moss Side constituency from 1961 to 1974.

He had unsuccessfully fought Newcastle-under-Lyme in 1955. He was elected for Moss Side in a by-election in 1961 caused by the death of the Conservative incumbent James Watts, and held the seat until he was defeated by Labour's Frank Hatton in February 1974, partly due to Taylor's seat having been merged with part of Hatton's former seat of Manchester Exchange.

References

External links 
 

1907 births
2003 deaths
Conservative Party (UK) MPs for English constituencies
UK MPs 1959–1964
UK MPs 1964–1966
UK MPs 1966–1970
UK MPs 1970–1974